Pimlico Opera is an opera company and registered charity founded in 1987 by Wasfi Kani.

The company aims to use participation in opera to advance personal developmentparticularly with younger people and to engender a sense of community.

The most recent production from Pimlico Opera was Sweet Charity staged in HMP Bronzefield in November 2018. Olivier award-nominated actress Laura Pitt-Pulford played the leading role of Charity Hope Valentine.

History 
Though its focus today is solely in prisons and primary schools, Pimlico Opera was known for 19 years (1990-2008) as an Arts Council-funded small-scale touring company. In those years, repertoire included the Da Ponte trilogy, Cenerentola, Falstaff, Pagliacci, Turn of the Screw, Rigoletto, Gianni Schicchi and the company travelled from Berwick-upon-Tweed to Padstow in Cornwall. 
Pimlico Opera staged the European première of Shostakovich's musical comedy Cheryomushki at the Lyric Theatre, Hammersmith on 20 October  1994. A translation was commissioned David Pountney and composer Gerard McBurney to create a reduced orchestration. A documentary was made by the BBC "Another Bite of the Cherry".

In prison 

Pimlico Opera has been staging productions in prisons since 1991. In 1993, BBC Wales filmed the three month process involved in putting on a show inside a prison. This was made into a documentary called Guys, Dolls and D-Wing that was aired on BBC2.

Prison projects since 1991:

1991: HMP Wormwood Scrubs Sweeney Todd

1992: HMP Wandsworth West Side Story

1993: HMP Wandsworth Guys & Dolls

1995: HMP Wandsworth West Side Story

1996: Mountjoy Prison Dublin  West Side Story 

1997: HMP Bullingdon, Oxfordshire West Side Story

1999: HMP Downview  Threepenny opera.

2001: HMP Winchester Threepenny Opera

2002: HMP Winchester West Side Story

2003: HMP Wormwood Scrubs Guys & Dolls

2004 HMP Ashwell, Leicestershire Assassins

2005: HMP Coldingley, Surrey Assassins

2006: HMP Bronzefield Middlesex Chicago

2007: HMP Wandsworth Les Miserables

2008: HMP Kingston Sweeney Todd (Project cancelled)

2009: HMP Wandsworth West Side Story

2010: HMP Wandsworth Carmen - The Musical

2011: HMP Send, Surrey Sugar

2012: HMP Erlestoke, Wiltshire Les Miserables 

2013: HMP Erlestoke, Wiltshire West Side Story

2014: HMP Bronzefield Sister Act

2015: HMP ISIS Our House

2017: HMP High Down Les Miserables

2018: HMP Bronzefield Sweet Charity

In primary schools 
Every week of the school year, Pimlico Opera gives 2,000 primary children a half hour singing class. Schools are selected in which there is little or no music provision, with KS2 results below the national average and a high percentage of free school meals.

The project takes place in Hampshire, Surrey, Durham, Newcastle, and Nottingham.

References

Further reading
 
 
 
 
 
 
 
 

Opera companies
Musical groups established in 1987
1987 establishments in the United Kingdom